The Wynoochee River is a  long river located in the Olympic Peninsula in the U.S. state of Washington. A tributary of the Chehalis River, the Wynoochee River rises in the Olympic Mountains within the Olympic National Park and flows generally south. The name Wynoochee comes from the Lower Chehalis placename /xʷənúɬč/, meaning "shifting".

See also
List of Washington rivers
Wynoochee Dam
Grays Harbor County

References

External links
 

Rivers of Washington (state)
Rivers of Grays Harbor County, Washington